The Fédération Internationale de Volleyball (English: International Volleyball Federation), commonly known by the acronym FIVB, is the international governing body for all forms of volleyball. Its headquarters are located in Lausanne, Switzerland, and its current president is Ary Graça of Brazil.

History 
Before the FIVB was founded volleyball was part of the International Amateur Handball Federation. The FIVB was founded in France in April 1947. In the late 1940s, some of the European national federations began to address the issue of creating an international governing body for the sport of volleyball. Initial discussions eventually lead to the installation of a Constitutive Congress in 1947. Fourteen national federations representing five different continents attended the meetings where, between 18 and 20 April, the entity was officially formed, having Frenchman Paul Libaud as first president. The first Asia volleyball championship was held at Tokyo (Japan ) in 1995 and in this championship India had beaten Japan in final.

One of the main goals of the 1947 Congress was achieved two years later with the establishment of the first international major volleyball event, the World Championship. In 1952, a women's version of the tournament was also introduced.

In 1964, the IOC endorsed the addition of volleyball to the Olympic programme. By this time, the number of national federations affiliated to the FIVB had grown to 89. Later in that year (1969), a new international event, the World Cup was introduced. It would be turned into a qualifying event for the Olympic Games in 1991.

Following Libaud's retirement and the election of Mexican Rubén Acosta Hernandez for the position of president in 1984, the FIVB moved its headquarters from Paris, France to Lausanne, Switzerland and intensified to an unprecedented level its policy of promoting volleyball on a worldwide basis. Measures taken in this direction include the establishment of annual competitions for men's and women's volleyball (the World League, in 1990, and the Grand Prix, in 1993), the indication of Beach volleyball as an Olympic event (1996) and a number of changes in the rules of the game with the purpose of enhancing public visibility.

On 19 June 2008, Wei Jizhong of China, who during this period served as the 1st Vice president took over during the 31st World Congress in Dubai when Dr. Rubén Acosta decided to step down. Mr. Jizhong Wei became the third president in the history of the FIVB. The handover of the presidency took place on 24 August 2008 in Beijing.

, the FIVB counted 222 affiliated national federations.

In response to the 2022 Russian invasion of Ukraine, the International Volleyball Federation suspended all Russian national teams, clubs, and officials, as well as beach and snow volleyball athletes, from all events, and stripped Russia of the right to host the 2022 FIVB Volleyball Men's World Championship in August 2022, and will relocate games that were to be in Russia in June and July.

Activities
The FIVB's main activity is worldwide planning and organisation of volleyball events, sometimes in conjunction with other international governing bodies such as the IOC. This involves defining qualification procedures and competition formulae for tournaments, as well as more specific details such as player line-up and replacement restrictions, venues and hosts.

The FIVB participates directly in the organization of continental volleyball events which have an attached international significance, such as Olympic and World Championship continental qualification tournaments.

Amongst others, the FIVB organizes the following international volleyball tournaments:

 Olympic Games: since 1964, quadrennially
 Men's World Championship: since 1949, quadrennially
 Women's World Championship: since 1952, quadrennially
 Men's World Cup: since 1965, quadrennially
 Women's World Cup: since 1973, quadrennially
 World Grand Champions Cup: since 1993, quadrennially
 Men's Nations League: since 2018, annually
 Women's Nations League: since 2018, annually
 Men's Challenger Cup: since 2018, annually
 Women's Challenger Cup: since 2018, annually
 Men's Club World Championship: since 1989, annually
 Women's Club World Championship: since 1991, annually

Defunct

 World League (Men): 1990–2017, annually
 World Grand Prix (Women): 1993–2017, annually

and the following international under-age volleyball tournaments:

 Youth Olympic Games: 2010
 Men's U21 World Championship (Junior): since 1977, biennially
 Women's U20 World Championship (Junior): since 1977, biennially
 Boys' U19 World Championship (Youth): since 1989, biennially
 Girls' U18 World Championship (Youth): since 1989, biennially

and the following international beach volleyball tournaments:

 Olympic Games: since 1996, quadrennially
 World Championship: since 1997, biennially
 World Tour: since 1989, annually

and the following international under-age beach volleyball tournaments:

 Youth Olympic Games: since 2014, quadrennially
 U23 World Championships: since 2013, annually
 U21 World Championships: since 2001, annually
 U19 World Championships: since 2003, annually
 U17 World Championships: since 2014, annually

The FIVB also maintains extensive special programmes aimed at the advance of world volleyball. This includes the constitution of development centers in areas where the sport is still unpopular, as well as support (in instruction and equipment) for organizations that fail to meet the quality standards required on an international level. Therefore, FIVB organizes congress, workshops, courses for referees, coaches and teachers, to promote grassroot volleyball development, such as:
 Volley All Festival
 Good Net Project in 2019 
 School Volleyball Congress in 2007
 Volleyball Medicine Congress in 2011
 Symposium on Match Analysis in 1981 
 Symposium on Mini Volleyball in 1985
Another relevant area of concern is the promotion of volleyball in a worldwide scale. Part of the FIVB's activities in this area consists in attracting media partners and sponsors through negotiation of commercial rights for broadcasting and coverage of major events.

As reported by Olympic news outlet Around the Rings, the FIVB recently launched a new "FIVB Heroes" promotion in Rome. The campaign uses billboards, posters and statues of the top beach volleyball players situated around the city to enhance visibility and profiles of the athletes.

The FIVB is responsible for the standardization of volleyball rules. In recent years, many changes were implemented in connection with its promotional and marketing vision, in an alleged attempt to improve public visibility and make the sport comply to the demands of sponsors and media organizations. These changes range from ingenuous, almost commonplace restrictions, such as the
obligation of a "fashionable" uniform – meaning tight clothing, supposed to be more appealing to the audience because it makes players bodies salient –, to very drastic changes in the format of competitions (e.g., the rally-point system).

The FIVB is the ultimate international authority in volleyball, and judges (or is involved at least to some degree in the judgement) issues such as doping, regulation of player transfer, nationality changes and gender determination. It also publishes the FIVB World Rankings, used as basis for seeding in international competitions.

Current champions in FIVB tournaments

Volleyball

Nations

Clubs

Beach volleyball

Intercontinental events

Under-age events

Rankings

Men's
The following table has the Top 20 ranked men's volleyball countries in the world.

Women's

The following table has the Top 20 ranked women's volleyball countries in the world.

Other events
The FIVB is also responsible for the volleyball games at some regional competitions as:

 Asian Games
 European Games
 Pan American Games
 Lusophony Games
 All-Africa Games

Organization

World Congress: The supreme authority convened every two years, electing the President and members of the Board.

Board of Administration: Responsible for the overall management of the FIVB, overseeing the work of the national federations, confederations, commissions and councils and appoints officials including members of the Executive Committee.

Executive Committee: Composed of Board members and each member is charged with important and specific responsibilities, assisted by Commissions, Committees and Councils.
 Legal Commission
 Finance Commission
 Communication Commission
 Rules of the Games and Refereeing Commission
 Technical and Coaching Commission
 Medical Commission
 Development Commission
 Beach Volleyball Commission
 Athletes Commission
 Sports Events Council
 Beach Volleyball World Tour Council
 World League Council
 World Grand Prix Council
 World Championships Council

Judicial Bodies
 FIVB Disciplinary Panel
 FIVB Appeals Panel
 FIVB Ethics Panel
 FIVB Tribunal

The FIVB also presides over five continental confederations:

  Asian Volleyball Confederation (AVC) in Asia and Oceania
  Confederación Sudamericana de Voleibol (CSV) in South America
  African Volleyball Confederation (CAVB) in Africa
  European Volleyball Confederation (CEV) in Europe
  North, Central America and Caribbean Volleyball Confederation (NORCECA) in North America

Each continental confederation, by its turn, presides over a number of national federations located in its domain of action.

FIVB Heroes
"FIVB Heroes" is the official image campaign of the FIVB. The campaign aims to raise awareness of the players’ athletic achievements and to increase the worldwide interest in the sport. “FIVB Heroes” features 33 volleyball and 29 beach volleyball players from 19 countries, who were selected due to their outstanding performance.

FIVB presidents
  Paul Libaud (1947–1984)
  Rubén Acosta Hernández (1984–2008)
  Wei Jizhong (2008–2012)
  Ary Graça (2012–Present)

Sponsors

See also

 Volleyball Hall of Fame
 List of international sport federations

Notes

References

External links
 
 Official CEV – Confederation Europeenne de Volleyball website 
 Official FIVB Heroes website
 Corruption scandal involving FIVB president Ary Graça
Official Volleyball Rules 2021-2024

 
Volleyball organizations
Organisations based in Lausanne
IOC-recognised international federations
International sports bodies based in Switzerland
Sports organizations established in 1947
1947 establishments in France